Bedwyr is the Welsh name for Bedivere, a character in the Arthurian legend. Notable people with the given name include:

 Bedwyr Lewis Jones (1933-1992), Welsh scholar, literary critic and linguist
 Bedwyr Williams (born 1974), Welsh artist

See also
The Sword of Bedwyr (1994), the first book in the Crimson Shadow series of fantasy novels by R. A. Salvatore

Welsh masculine given names